Terrell Independent School District is a public school district based in Terrell, Texas, United States.

In 2009, the school district was rated "academically acceptable" by the Texas Education Agency.

School uniforms
All TISD students are required to wear school uniforms .

Schools
Terrell High School (Grades 9-12)
Herman Furlough, Jr. Middle School (Grades 6-8)
Dr. Bruce Wood Intermediate School (Grades K-5)
J.W. Long Elementary School (Grades K-5)
Gilbert Willie, Sr. Elementary School (Grades K-5)
W.H. Burnett Early Childhood Center (Serving three- and four-year olds)

Alternative Campuses
Global Leadership Academy
Terrell Alternative Education Center (TAEC)
Terrell ISD Child & Adolescent Center

References

External links
 

School districts in Kaufman County, Texas
School districts in Hunt County, Texas